Rupert D'Cruze is a British conductor who resides in New Zealand.

His earliest musical training was as a chorister in the Temple Church Choir, London. He later performed in the London Schools Symphony Orchestra and the European Union Youth Orchestra. He played and taught the trombone prior to becoming a conductor.

In 1987, at the Royal Academy of Music, D'Cruze was awarded the Philharmonia Conducting Prize. He also has received prizes at the Tokyo International Conducting Competition in 1991 and at the Hungarian International Conducting Competition in 1992.

In 2006, D'Cruze moved to New Zealand, and was appointed Musical Director of the Trust Waikato Symphony Orchestra in 2009, and in March 2010 became the Music Director for the Dalewool Auckland Brass. He is also a founder member of the Waikato Brass Quintet.

References

External links
Rupert D'Cruze official site
Trust Waikato Symphony Orchestra official site
Dalewool Auckland Brass official site

British male conductors (music)
Living people
Year of birth missing (living people)
Place of birth missing (living people)
British emigrants to New Zealand
21st-century British conductors (music)
21st-century British male musicians